The Dark Side of Midnight (also known as The Creeper) is a 1984 thriller written and directed by Wes Olsen. The plot follows a detective on the trail of a serial killer known as 'The Creeper', whose relentless string of murders are terrorizing the residents of a small town.

The film is currently distributed by Troma Entertainment.

External links

1984 films
American independent films
Troma Entertainment films
1984 thriller films
1980s English-language films
1980s American films